Seán O'Neill (born 1938, Newry) is a former Irish sportsperson. He played Gaelic football with his local club John Mitchel and was a member of the Down senior inter-county team from the 1950s until the 1960s.  O'Neill is one of only four Down players to win three All-Ireland titles.

Career

O'Neill scored 85 goals and over 500 points for Down senior football team in his career, and was a key figure in the county’s All-Ireland victories of 1960, 1961 and 1968. O'Neill's credits include eight Ulster senior football medals and eight Railway Cup medals in 1960, 1963 to 1966, 1968, 1970 and 1971. He won three National League medals, in 1960, 1962 and 1968, as well as six All Star awards. Other honours include a Sigerson Cup medal with the Queen's University of Belfast in 1958, whom he later coached to further wins.  He played club football with John Mitchel GFC Newry, winning the Down Senior Football Championship in 1960, 1964, 1967 and 1968. He also won the Down Minor Championship with Newry Mitchels in 1956 - the year the club was formed. His brother Kevin won an all Ireland with down in the 1960s.

Along with Joe Lennon, Dan McCartan and Paddy Doherty he was one of four Down men who won all three All-Ireland medals in the 1960s.

Later life
O'Neill was the Down minor team coach, winning the 1977 All-Ireland Minor Football Championship.

Sean coached the Queen's University Belfast senior team in the early 1980s.  As coach, he won the Sigerson Cup in 1982 and the Ryan Cup in 1984 and 1985.

In 1984, the Gaelic Athletic Association centenary year, he was honoured by being named on their Football Team of the Century. In 2000 he was again honoured by the GAA by being named on their Gaelic Football Team of the Millennium.

O'Neill is a solicitor by profession.

Honours
 Railway Cup (8) 1960 1963 1964 1965 1966 1968 1970 1971
 Ulster Senior Football Championship (8) 1959 1960 1961 1963 1965 1966 1968 1971
 Dr Lagan Cup (5) 1960 1961 1962 1963 1964
 Dr McKenna Cup (4) 1959 1961 1964 1972
 Cú Chulainn Awards (4) 1963 1964 1965 1967
 Down Senior Football Championship (4) 1960 1964 1967 1968
 All-Ireland Senior Football Championship (3) 1960 1961 1968
 National Football League Division 1  (3) 1960 1962 1968
 GAA GPA All Stars Awards (2) 1971 1972
 Sigerson Cup (2) 1958 1964
 Down Division 1 Football League (2) 1965 1968
 Texaco Footballer of the Year (1) 1968

Manager 
 Ulster Minor Football Championship (2) 1977 1979
 All-Ireland Minor Football Championship (1) 1977

References

External links
 Down’s historic All-Ireland win remembered 60 years on

1938 births
Living people
Alumni of Queen's University Belfast
Down inter-county Gaelic footballers
Newry Mitchels Gaelic footballers
People educated at Abbey Christian Brothers' Grammar School
Sportspeople from Newry
Ulster inter-provincial Gaelic footballers
Queen's University Belfast Gaelic footballers